Garbiñe Muguruza defeated Venus Williams in the final, 7–5, 6–0 to win the ladies' singles tennis title at the 2017 Wimbledon Championships. It was her second major singles title. She dropped just one set during the tournament, to Angelique Kerber in the fourth round.

Serena Williams was the two-time reigning champion, but did not participate due to pregnancy.

Venus Williams was the oldest player to reach the final since Martina Navratilova in 1994, and played her 100th Wimbledon singles match in the quarterfinals; it was her first Wimbledon final since 2009 and (by virtue of her run to the Australian Open final) marked the first time she reached multiple major finals in a calendar year since 2003. Johanna Konta became the first Briton to reach the semifinals since Virginia Wade in 1978, and Magdaléna Rybáriková became the first Slovak woman to reach the semifinals.

The tournament was the 17th consecutive women's singles major to feature a first-time semifinalist (Rybáriková), dating back to 2013 Wimbledon.

Despite losing in the second round, Karolína Plíšková attained the WTA No. 1 singles ranking, after Angelique Kerber and Simona Halep lost in the fourth round and quarterfinals, respectively.

This tournament marked the major main draw debuts of future US Open champion Bianca Andreescu and Australian Open champion Aryna Sabalenka. They lost to Kristína Kučová and Carina Witthöft in the first and second rounds respectively.

Seeds

Draw

Finals

Top half

Section 1

Section 2

Section 3

Section 4

Bottom half

Section 5

Section 6

Section 7

Section 8

Seeded players
Seeds are based on the WTA rankings as of 26 June 2017.

Rank and points before are as of 3 July 2017. Because the tournament takes place one week later than in 2016, points defending includes results from both the 2016 Wimbledon Championships and the tournaments from the week of 11 July 2016 (Bucharest and Gstaad).

Withdrawals
The following players would have been seeded, but withdrew from the event.

Other entry information

Wild cards

Protected ranking

Qualifiers

The qualifying competitions take place in Bank of England Sports Centre, Roehampton started from 26 June 2017 and to be scheduled to end on 29 June 2017. However, due to heavy rain on the second day, it has now extended to 30 June 2017.

Withdrawals

 – not included on entry list& – withdrew from entry list

Retirements
  Bethanie Mattek-Sands
  Anastasia Potapova

Championship match statistics

Notes

References

 Women's Singles Draw

External links
 2017 Wimbledon Championships - Ladies' Singles Draw
 2017 Wimbledon Championships – Women's draws and results at the International Tennis Federation

Women's Singles
Wimbledon Championship by year – Women's singles